Norway competed at the 2022 Winter Olympics in Beijing, China, from 4 to 20 February 2022. The Norwegian team consisted of 84 athletes. Kjetil Jansrud and Kristin Skaslien were the country's flagbearers during the opening ceremony. Biathlete Marte Olsbu Røiseland was the flag bearer during the closing ceremony.

Three days before the closing ceremony, Norway won its 14th gold medal, thus matching its record performance of 2018, as well as Canada's 2010 and Germany's 2018 results. Norway won its 15th gold medal on 18 February, thus breaking the record.
This should be seen in light of the ongoing medal inflation, e.g., from 16 gold medals in 1924 to 109 in 2022. However, Norway also holds the medal inflation-adjusted records: in 1936, Norwegian athletes won 41% of all events (7 out of 17), in 1928, 43% (6 out of 14). As of 20 February 2022, this percentage for the 2022 Games stands at ~14%.

Medalists

The following Norwegian competitors won medals at the games. In the discipline sections below, the medalists' names are bolded.

Competitors
The following is the list of number of competitors participating at the Games per sport/discipline.

Alpine skiing

Norway qualified ten male and nine female alpine skiers, but returned five of their female quotas.

Men

Women

Mixed

Biathlon

Based on their Nations Cup rankings in the 2020–21 Biathlon World Cup and 2021–22 Biathlon World Cup, Norway has qualified a team of 6 men and 6 women.

Men

Women

Mixed

Cross-country skiing

Norway qualified the maximum of eight male and eight female cross-country skiers.

The 2018 champion in the 30 km skiathlon, Simen Hegstad Krüger, qualified for the Olympics but tested positive for COVID just before the games. Even though he had no symptoms, he was not allowed to fly to China with the rest of the team to get a chance to defend the title. Earlier, Heidi Weng and Anne Kjersti Kalvå also tested positive and had to miss the Olympics.
However, six days before the 50 km race was to start, Krüger had negative tests and was allowed to participate. He then won the bronze medal in the race, which then had been shortened to 28 km caused by weather conditions.

Distance
Men

Women

Sprint
Men

Women

Curling

Summary

Men's tournament

Norway has qualified their men's team (five athletes), by finishing first in the round robin in the 2021 Olympic Qualification Event.

Round robin
Norway had a bye in draws 3, 7 and 11.

Draw 1
Wednesday, 9 February, 20:05

Draw 2
Thursday, 10 February, 14:05

Draw 4
Friday, 11 February, 20:05

Draw 5
Saturday, 12 February, 14:05

Draw 6
Sunday, 13 February, 9:05

Draw 8
Monday, 14 February, 14:05

Draw 9
Tuesday, 15 February, 9:05

Draw 10
Tuesday, 15 February, 20:05

Draw 12
Thursday, 17 February, 9:05

Mixed doubles tournament

Norway has qualified their mixed doubles team (two athletes), by finishing in the top seven teams in the 2021 World Mixed Doubles Curling Championship.

Round robin
Norway had a bye in draws 2, 6, 8 and 10.

Draw 1
Wednesday, 2 February, 20:05

Draw 3
Thursday, 3 February, 14:05

Draw 4
Thursday, 3 February, 20:05

Draw 5
Friday, 4 February, 8:35

Draw 7
Saturday, 5 February, 9:05

Draw 9
Saturday, 5 February, 20:05

Draw 11
Sunday, 6 February, 14:05

Draw 12
Sunday, 6 February, 20:05

Draw 13
Monday, 7 February, 9:05

Semifinal
Monday, 7 February, 20:05

Final
Tuesday, 8 February, 20:05

Freestyle skiing

Norway qualified 4 men and 2 women.

Freeski
Men

Women

Nordic combined

Norway qualified 5 athletes.

Ski jumping

Norway qualified 5 men and 3 women. Johann André Forfang was qualified and selected to the team but did not participate in any events.

Men

Women

Mixed

Snowboarding

Norway qualified 3 men and 1 women.

Men

Women

Speed skating

Men

Women

Mass start

Team Pursuit

See also
Norway at the 2022 Winter Paralympics

References

Nations at the 2022 Winter Olympics
2022
Winter Olympics